Rick Pizzo, a native of Staten Island, NY is an American sports broadcaster who currently works for the Big Ten Network. Pizzo received his bachelor's degree from Hamilton College, and a masters from Syracuse University. Pizzo is one of the original Big Ten Network hosts, alongside Dave Revsine and Mike Hall.A former collegiate hockey player and golfer at Hamilton, Pizzo is BTN's main hockey and golf host.

Previous experience

WBTW
From 1998 to 2001, Pizzo worked as a sports anchor/reporter for WBTW, Myrtle Beach, SC.

WFMY
From 2001 to 2007, Pizzo worked as a sports reporter, anchor/reporter for WFMY, Greensboro, North Carolina. While in Greensboro, he was named an Associated Press Award-winning sports reporter/anchor and taught sports broadcasting classes at Elon (NC) University.

References

American sports journalists
Living people
Year of birth missing (living people)